North Macedonia is a country in the Balkan peninsula in Southeast Europe. Ranked as the fourth "best reformatory state" out of 178 countries ranked by the World Bank in 2009, North Macedonia has undergone considerable economic reform since independence. The country has developed an open economy with trade accounting for more than 90% of GDP in recent years. Since 1996, North Macedonia has witnessed steady, though slow, economic growth with GDP growing by 3.1% in 2005. This figure was projected to rise to an average of 5.2% in the 2006–2010 period. The government has proven successful in its efforts to combat inflation, with an inflation rate of only 3% in 2006 and 2% in 2007, and has implemented policies focused on attracting foreign investment and promoting the development of small and medium-sized enterprises (SMEs). The current government introduced a flat tax system with the intention of making the country more attractive to foreign investment. The flat tax rate was 12% in 2007 and was further lowered to 10% in 2008.

Tourism is an important part of the economy of North Macedonia. The country's abundance of natural and cultural attractions make it an attractive destination of visitors. It receives about 700,000 tourists annually.

Notable firms 
This list includes notable companies with primary headquarters located in the country. The industry and sector follow the Industry Classification Benchmark taxonomy. Organizations which have ceased operations are included and noted as defunct.

Defunct companies

Gallery

See also 
 Economy of North Macedonia
 List of banks in North Macedonia
 List of supermarket chains in North Macedonia
 Tourism in North Macedonia

References 

 

North Macedonia